Pelodryadinae, also known as Australian treefrogs (although not all members are arboreal), is a subfamily of frogs found in the region of Australia and New Guinea, and have also been introduced to New Caledonia, Guam, New Zealand, and Vanuatu.

The subfamily is thought to be the sister group to the leaf frogs (Phyllomedusinae), a subfamily of arboreal frogs known from the Neotropics. The common ancestor of both subfamilies is thought to have lived in early Cenozoic South America, with the two subfamilies diverging from one another during the Eocene. The ancestors of the subfamily Pelodryadinae likely invaded Australasia via Antarctica, which at the time was not yet frozen over, thus was hospitable for the dispersing frogs. The clade comprising both subfamilies is sister to the Hylinae, from which they diverged in the early Paleogene.

Classification

The subfamily contains 222 species in three genera:
 Litoria (102 species)
 Nyctimystes (44 species)
 Ranoidea (71 species)
 Genus incertae sedis (5 species)
 "Litoria" castanea (Steindachner, 1867)
 "Litoria" jeudii (Werner, 1901)
 "Litoria" louisiadensis (Tyler, 1968)
 "Litoria" obtusirostris Meyer, 1875
 "Litoria" vagabunda (Peters and Doria, 1878)

References

External links

http://www.tolweb.org/Pelodryadinae

 
Taxa named by Albert Günther
Amphibian subfamilies
Hylidae